The 52nd series of University Challenge began on 29 August 2022 on BBC Two. A special programme commemorating the show's 60th anniversary was broadcast on the same night.

This will be the final series hosted by Jeremy Paxman, who has been confirmed to be standing down from the role after 29 years. From Autumn 2023 onwards, Amol Rajan will succeed Paxman as host of the long-running student quiz show.

Paxman’s last-ever appearance as host will air sometime later in 2023 at the end of the 52nd series.

Results
 Winning teams are highlighted in bold.
 Teams with green scores (winners) returned in the next round, while those with red scores (losers) were eliminated (as it was impossible for them to be in the highest scoring losers).
 Teams with orange scores had to win one more match to return in the next round.
 Teams with yellow scores indicate that two further matches had to be played and won (teams that lost their first quarter-final match).
 A score in italics indicates a match decided on a tie-breaker question.

First round

Highest scoring losers play-offs

Second round

Quarter-finals

Spin-off: Christmas Special 2022

First round
Each year, a Christmas special sequence is aired featuring distinguished alumni. Out of 7 first-round winners, the top 4 highest-scoring teams progress to the semi-finals. The teams consist of celebrities who represent their alma maters. This was the last Christmas special to be hosted by Jeremy Paxman after 11 years.

Winning teams are highlighted in bold.
Teams with green scores (winners) returned in the next round, while those with red scores (losers) were eliminated.
Teams with grey scores won their match but did not achieve a high enough score to proceed to the next round.
A score in italics indicates a match decided on a tie-breaker question.

Standings for the winners

Semi-finals

Final

The winning Balliol College, Oxford team consisted of Elizabeth Kiss, Andrew Copson, Martin Edwards and Martin O’Neill beat the University of Hull and their team of Katharine Norbury, James Graham, Sian Reese-Williams and Graeme Hall.

References

External links
University Challenge homepage
Blanchflower Results Table

2022
2022 British television seasons
2023 British television seasons